Judge Barrister Police Commissioner is a  Dhallywood Bengali film directed and produced by F I Manik. The film features an ensemble cast of Shakib Khan,  Razzak, Alamgir, Sohel Rana and Purnima in the lead roles. The film released on 10 May 2013.The film had background music from Hindi Movies Krrish and Veer Zaara.

Cast
 Shakib Khan
 Purnima
 Razzak
 Alamgir
 Sohel Rana
 Suchorita
 Misha Sawdagor
 Sadek Bachchu
 Ahmed Sharif
 Suchorita
 Rehana Jolly
 Shiba Shanu

Production
The production of the movie was started in 2011. The movie was expected to hit screens in 2012, but due to some financial and casting problems, it failed to do so.

Soundtrack 
The soundtrack of Judge Barrister Police Commissioner was composed by  Alauddin Ali, and lyrics were penned by Gazi Mazarul Anwar, Munshi Wadud, and Kabir Bakul. Andrew Kishore, Sabina Yasmin, Kanak Chapa, S.I. Tutul, Saiful Islam, Monir Khan and Biplob sang for this film.

Track listing

See also
Cinema of Bangladesh
List of Bangladeshi films of 2013

References

2013 films
2013 crime drama films
Bengali-language Bangladeshi films
Bangladeshi crime drama films
Films scored by Alauddin Ali
2010s Bengali-language films